This article lists all the confirmed national football squads for the UEFA Women's Euro 2001.

Players marked (c) were named as captain for their national squad.

Group A

Head coach:  Tina Theune-Meyer

Head coach:  Marika Domanski-Lyfors

Sweden caps and goals based on compilation of match reports at https://www.svenskfotboll.se/landslag/dam/landskamper-1973-2000/ & https://www.svenskfotboll.se/landslag/dam/landskamper-2001-2010/

Head coach:  Yuri Bystritsky

Head coach:  Hope Powell

Group B

Head coach:  Poul Højmose

Head coach:  Åge Steen

Head coach:  Carolina Morace

Head coach:  Élisabeth Loisel

References

External links
 European Women Championship 2001 - Match Details at RSSSF.com

Squads
2001